Occupy San José was a peaceful protest and demonstration in City Hall Plaza in San Jose, California. The demonstration was inspired by Occupy Wall Street and is part of the larger "Occupy" protest movement. The aim of the demonstration was to begin a sustained occupation in downtown San José, the 10th largest city in the United States, to protest perceived corporate greed and social inequality, including opposing corporate influence in U.S. politics, the influence of money and corporations on democracy and a lack of legal and political repercussions for the global financial crisis.

As of June 2012, Occupy San José had continued to engage in organized meetings and actions.

After a year of actions and twice-weekly assemblies, Occupy San José celebrated their anniversary October 6, 2012.

Chronology of events
The following is a timeline of Occupy San José events and activity.
 On September 17, 2011 Occupy Wall Street protests began in New York.
 On October 6, 2011, after four nights of occupying San José City Hall, City Attorney Rick Doyle announced plans to ask the San Jose Police Department to order protestors to leave on Friday.
 Around 12:30 AM on October 10, 2011, one protester was cited by police when he refused to vacate the Occupy San José site. All other protestors and their belongings were moved off-site by police, though by early morning some protestors had returned.
 On October 21, 2011 at around 3:00 AM eight protestors were arrested and one cited by San José city police. City ordinances prohibit overnight camping on public property. Police stated that vandalism and sanitation issues also were a factor.

San José city ordinance on camping in city hall plaza
Section 13.23.300.H of the San José Municipal Code of Ordinances states:
"No person shall camp on the city hall plaza. No person shall enter or remain on the plaza (except the sidewalks) after closing time, as established by the regulations, unless authorized to do so by the director."

See also

Occupy articles
 List of global "Occupy" protest locations
 Occupy movement
 Timeline of Occupy Wall Street
 We are the 99%
Other Bay Area "Occupy" protest articles
 Occupy Oakland
 Occupy San Francisco

Other 2011 protests
 15 October 2011 global protests
 2011 United States public employee protests
 2011 Wisconsin protests

Related articles
 Bank Transfer Day
 Arab Spring
 Corruption Perceptions Index
 Economic inequality
 Income inequality in the United States
 Tea Party protests
 Wealth inequality in the United States

References

External links
 
 Occupy San José on the Occupy Wiki
 Occupy Wiki Links

Occupy movement in California
2011 in California
Nonviolent resistance movements
21st century in San Jose, California
Culture of San Jose, California
Organizations based in San Jose, California
2012 in California
Protests in the San Francisco Bay Area
Politics of San Jose, California